Gangdong District (Gangdong-gu) is one of the 25 gu which make up the city of Seoul, South Korea.  Gangdong is literally "east of the (Han) River".  It is located on the east side of the city.

Jungbu (literally "Central Part") Express Motorway starts in and passes through Sangil-dong, which is located in the east end of this district. In Amsa-dong, there is a Pre-historic heritage site which is about six thousand years old. At this site, there are many kinds of pottery and houses. The pottery which has been found was made of ceramic and is circular and shaped into a point similar to corn.

Administrative divisions

 Gangil-dong (강일동 江一洞)
 Godeok-dong (고덕동 高德洞)
 Gil-dong (길동 吉洞)
 Dunchon-dong (둔촌동 遁村洞)
 Myeongil-dong (명일동 明逸洞)
 Sangil-dong (상일동 上一洞)
 Seongnae-dong (성내동 城內洞)
 Amsa-dong (암사동 岩寺洞)
 Cheonho-dong (천호동 千戶洞)

Education
Gangdong District is home to 25 elementary schools, 17 junior high schools and 12 senior high schools, including a specialized high school (Hanyoung Foreign Language High School), and a special education school (Jumong School).

Transportation

Railroad (Seoul Metro)
Seoul Subway Line 5
(Gwangjin-gu) ← Cheonho — Gangdong — Gil-dong — Gubeundari — Myeongil — Godeok — Sangil-dong
Seoul Subway Line 5 Macheon Branch
Gangdong — Dunchon-dong → (Songpa-gu)
Seoul Subway Line 8
Amsa — Cheonho — Gangdong-gu Office → (Songpa-gu)

Sister cities

 Bonghwa, South Korea
 Buyeo, South Korea
 Cheongyang, South Korea
 Eumseong, South Korea
 Fengtai, China
 Geochang, South Korea
 Gokseong, South Korea
 Gyeongsan, South Korea
 Hangzhou, China
 Hongcheon, South Korea
 Icheon, South Korea
 Jinan, South Korea
 Kent, United States
 Lobo, Philippines
 Musashino, Japan
 Qinhuangdao, China
 Segovia, Spain
 Songino Khairkhan, Mongolia
 Tangshan, China
 Wando, South Korea
 Yeongyang, South Korea
 Willoughby (City), Australia

See also
Geography of South Korea

References

External links

Official site 
Official site  

 
Districts of Seoul